Elatostema reticulatum is a flowering plant in the nettle family. A lush herbaceous plant with thick soft stems. Growing to 50 cm high, and often seen along rainforest streams. Flowering occurs in summer. Found in eastern Australia from Batemans Bay in the south to tropical Queensland in the north. The specific epithet alludes to the reticulated veiny leaves. Joan Cribb suggests the stems and young leaves are edible, and taste better than spinach.

References

reticulatum
Rosales of Australia
Flora of New South Wales
Flora of Queensland
Plants described in 1854